Kendomycin is an anticancer macrolide first isolated from Streptomyces violaceoruber.  It has potent activity as an endothelin receptor antagonist and anti-osteoporosis agent.
It also has strong cytotoxicity against various tumor cell lines.

Total synthesis
Because of its potent biological activities, kendomycin has attracted interest as a target of total synthesis. The first total synthesis of kendomycin was accomplished by Lee and Yuan in 2004. The total number of syntheses stands at 6.

References

Macrolides
Antibiotics
Quinone methides
Total synthesis